The 2023 PGA Tour Latinoamérica will be the 11th season of the PGA Tour Latinoamérica, the principal men's professional golf tour in Latin America, operated and run by the PGA Tour.

Schedule
The following table lists official events during the 2023 season.

Developmental Series
The following table lists Developmental Series events during the 2022–23 season.

Notes

References

PGA Tour Latinoamérica
PGA Tour Latinoamerica
PGA Tour Latinoamerica